Kvitskardtinden is a mountain on the border of Vågå Municipality and Vang Municipality in Innlandet county, Norway. The mountain is surrounded by several other notable mountains including Store Svartdalspiggen, Langedalstinden, and Mesmogtinden to the northwest; Knutsholstinden and Leirungstinden to the north; Leirungskampen and Kalvehøgde to the east, and Torfinnstindene to the southeast.

See also
List of mountains of Norway by height

References

Jotunheimen
Vågå
Vang, Oppland
Mountains of Innlandet